The 2011–12 UC Santa Barbara Gauchos men's basketball team represented the University of California, Santa Barbara during the 2011–12 NCAA Division I men's basketball season. The Gauchos, led by 14th year head coach Bob Williams, played their home games at the UC Santa Barbara Events Center, nicknamed The Thunderdome, and are members of the Big West Conference. They finished the season 20–11, 12–4 in Big West play to finish in a tie for second place. They lost in the championship game of the Big West Basketball tournament to Long Beach State. They were invited to the 2012 CollegeInsider.com Tournament where they lost in the first round to Idaho.

Roster
Source

Schedule

|-
!colspan=9| Exhibition

|-
!colspan=9| Regular season

|-
!colspan=9| 2012 Big West Conference men's basketball tournament

|-
!colspan=9| 2012 CIT

References

UC Santa Barbara Gauchos men's basketball seasons
UC Santa Barbara
UC Santa Barbara